Bargoed Interchange is a bus station located in the town centre of Bargoed, South Wales. It is situated near the High Street.

Background 

The new station building was funded through the European Union Regional Development Fund, and through the Welsh Government's Targeted Match Funding, Transport Grant programme, and the Heads of the Valleys Programme.

Layout 

The toilet facilities closed in April 2019 due to the increasing financial difficulties faced by Caerphilly Council. Caerphilly Town Centre public toilets re-opened in July 2019 but the fate of facilities in Blackwood remain uncertain.

The station was covered by Caerphilly Council's Public Space Protection Orders issued in 2015, which introduced Community Safety Wardens empowered to issue fixed penalty notices of £100 for any incidents of anti-social activities at the station, including any "disorderly, indecent or offensive" behaviour including loitering. The orders also apply to bus stations in Blackwood and Nelson, and the train and bus station areas in Caerphilly. Bargoed Bus Station has previously suffered from a high number of reports related to youth anti-social behaviour.

Destinations 

Bargoed services run to Newport, Merthyr Tydfil, Blackwood, Caerphilly, Pontypridd, and Ystrad Mynach.

Rail transport 

 Rhymney line

 Rhymney railway station (17 minutes)
 Caerphilly railway station (22 minutes)
 Cardiff Queen Street railway station (37 minutes)
 Cardiff Central railway station (43 minutes)

 Penarth branch line

 Penarth railway station (61 minutes)

References 

Buildings and structures in Caerphilly County Borough
Bargoed
Bus stations in Wales